Stanley David Griggs (September 7, 1939 – June 17, 1989) was a United States Navy officer and a NASA astronaut. He is credited with conducting the first unscheduled extra-vehicular activity of the space program during Space Shuttle mission STS-51-D. Griggs was killed when the vintage World War II-era training aircraft he was piloting – a North American AT-6D (registration N3931S) – crashed near Earle, Arkansas.

Early life
Born September 7, 1939, in Portland, Oregon, Griggs graduated from Lincoln High School in his hometown in 1957. He was an Eagle Scout. In 1962 he received a Bachelor of Science degree from the United States Naval Academy and in 1970 a Master of Science degree in Administration from George Washington University. He enjoyed flying, auto restoration, running, skiing, and diving. He married Karen Frances Kreeb and they had two daughters together, Alison Marie (August 21, 1971) and Carre Anne (May 14, 1974).

Navy career
Griggs graduated from Annapolis in 1962 and entered Naval pilot training shortly thereafter. In 1964, he received his United States Navy pilot wings and was attached to Attack Squadron-72 flying A-4 Skyhawks. He completed one Mediterranean cruise and two Southeast Asia combat cruises aboard the aircraft carriers USS Independence and USS Franklin Roosevelt.

In 1967 Griggs entered the U.S. Naval Test Pilot School at Patuxent River, Maryland and upon completion of test pilot training was assigned to the Flying Qualities and Performance Branch, Flight Test Division, where he flew various test projects on fighter and attack-type aircraft. In 1970, he resigned his regular United States Navy commission and affiliated with the Naval Air Reserve in which he achieved the rank of Rear Admiral.

As a Naval Reservist, Griggs was assigned to several fighter and attack squadrons flying A-4 Skyhawk, A-7 Corsair II and F-8 Crusader aircraft based at Naval Air Stations in New Orleans, Louisiana and Miramar, California.

He logged 9,500 hours flying time, 7,800 hours in jet aircraft, and flew over 45 different types of aircraft including single and multi engine prop, turboprop and jet aircraft, helicopters, gliders, hot air balloons and the Space Shuttle. He made over 300 aircraft carrier landings, held an Airline Transport Pilot License, and was a certified flight instructor.

NASA career

In July 1970, Griggs was employed at the Lyndon B. Johnson Space Center as a research pilot, working on various flight test and research projects in support of NASA programs. In 1974, he was assigned duties as the project pilot for the Space Shuttle trainer aircraft and participated in the design, development, and testing of those aircraft pending their operational deployment in 1976. He was appointed Chief of the Shuttle Training Aircraft Operations Office in January 1976 with responsibility for the operational use of the shuttle trainer, and held that position until being selected as an astronaut candidate by NASA in January 1978. In August 1979, he completed a one-year training and evaluation period and became eligible for Space Shuttle flight crew assignment.

From 1979 to 1983, Griggs was involved in several Space Shuttle engineering capacities including the development and testing of the Head-Up Display (HUD) approach and landing avionics system, development of the Manned Maneuvering Unit (MMU), and the requirements definition and verification of on-orbit rendezvous and entry flight phase software and procedures. In September 1983 he began crew training as a mission specialist for flight STS-51-D, which flew April 12–19, 1985. During the flight, Griggs conducted the first unscheduled extravehicular activity (space walk) of the space program. The space walk lasted for over three hours during which preparations for a satellite rescue attempt were completed.

At the time of his death, Griggs was in flight crew training as pilot for STS-33, a dedicated Department of Defense mission, scheduled for launch in November 1989. He was buried at Arlington National Cemetery.

Awards and honors
   Defense Distinguished Service Medal
   Distinguished Flying Cross
   Meritorious Service Medal
   Air Medal with two Silver Stars and four Gold Stars
   Navy Commendation Medal with three Gold Stars
   Navy Unit Commendation
   Navy Meritorious Unit Commendation
   National Defense Service Medal
   Vietnamese Cross of Gallantry
   Republic of Vietnam Campaign Medal
 NASA Space Flight Medal
 NASA Achievement Award
 NASA Sustained Superior Performance Award

References

 
 Astronautix S. David Griggs bio
 Spacefacts biography of S. David Griggs

External links
 Stanley David Griggs at ArlingtonCemetery.net, an unofficial website

1939 births
1989 deaths
Accidental deaths in Arkansas
United States Navy personnel of the Vietnam War
American test pilots
Aviators killed in aviation accidents or incidents in the United States
Burials at Arlington National Cemetery
George Washington University alumni
Lincoln High School (Portland, Oregon) alumni
NASA civilian astronauts
Recipients of the Air Medal
Recipients of the Defense Distinguished Service Medal
Recipients of the Distinguished Flying Cross (United States)
Recipients of the Gallantry Cross (Vietnam)
Space Shuttle program astronauts
United States Naval Academy alumni
United States Naval Aviators
United States Navy rear admirals (upper half)
Victims of aviation accidents or incidents in 1989
Spacewalkers